The D.I.C.E. Award for Outstanding Achievement in Game Design is an award presented annually by the Academy of Interactive Arts & Sciences during the academy's annual D.I.C.E. Awards. This award is "presented to the title that most effectively combines interactive and non-interactive elements to create a cohesive gameplay experience. Outstanding design is exemplified by balanced system design, cohesive mechanics that relate to overall aesthetic direction, level layout, challenge flow, progression elements, interface design, and social game mechanics. This award recognizes the Lead Designer or Design Director in architecting all elements into a unified design." It was originally presented as the Outstanding Achievement in Interactive Design and was renamed at the 3rd Annual Interactive Achievement Awards. The award would not be offered at the awards from 2011 to 2014.

The award's most recent winner is Elden Ring, developed by FromSoftware and published by Bandai Namco Entertainment.

Winners and nominees

1990s

2000s 
{| class="wikitable sortable" style="width:100%;"
|- style="background:#bebebe"
!scope="col" style="width:6%;"|Year
!scope="col" style="width:30%;"|Game
!scope="col" style="width:30%;"|Developer(s)
!scope="col" style="width:30%;"|Publisher(s)
!scope="col" style="width:4%;" class="unsortable"|
|-
!scope="row" rowspan="5" style="text-align:center"|2000 (4th) 
|style="background:#FAEB86"|The Legend of Zelda: Majora's Mask
|style="background:#FAEB86"|Nintendo EAD
|style="background:#FAEB86"|Nintendo
!scope="row" rowspan="5" style="text-align;center;" |
|-
|Jet Grind Radio
|Smilebit
|Sega
|-
|Rayman 2: The Great Escape
|Ubi Pictures
|Ubisoft
|-
|Shenmue
|Sega AM2
|Sega
|-
|Tony Hawk's Pro Skater 2
|Neversoft
|Activision
|-
!scope="row" rowspan="6" style="text-align:center"|2001 (5th) 
|style="background:#FAEB86"|Grand Theft Auto III
|style="background:#FAEB86"|DMA Design
|style="background:#FAEB86"|Rockstar Games
!scope="row" rowspan="6" style="text-align;center;" |
|-
|Dark Age of Camelot
|Mythic Entertainment
|Vivendi Universal Games
|-
|Halo: Combat Evolved
|Bungie
|Microsoft Game Studios
|-
|Ico
|Japan Studio
|rowspan="2"|Sony Computer Entertainment
|-
|Jak & Daxter: The Precursor Legacy
|Naughty Dog
|-
|Pikmin
|Nintendo EAD
|Nintendo
|-
!scope="row" rowspan="5" style="text-align:center"|2002 (6th) 
|style="background:#FAEB86"|Animal Crossing
|style="background:#FAEB86"|Nintendo EAD
|style="background:#FAEB86"|Nintendo
!scope="row" rowspan="5" style="text-align;center;" |
|-
|Battlefield 1942
|DICE
|Electronic Arts
|-
|Metroid Prime
|Retro Studios
|Nintendo
|-
|Neverwinter Nights
|BioWare
|Infogrames
|-
|Warcraft III: Reign of Chaos|Blizzard Entertainment
|Blizzard Entertainment
|-
!scope="row" rowspan="5" style="text-align:center"|2003 (7th) 
|style="background:#FAEB86"|Prince of Persia: The Sands of Time|style="background:#FAEB86"|Ubisoft Montreal
|style="background:#FAEB86"|Ubisoft
!scope="row" rowspan="5" style="text-align;center;" |
|-
|Amplitude|Harmonix
|Sony Computer Entertainment
|-
|Star Wars: Knights of the Old Republic|BioWare
|LucasArts
|-
|Tony Hawk's Underground|Neversoft
|Activision
|-
|The Legend of Zelda: The Wind Waker|Nintendo EAD
|Nintendo
|-
!scope="row" rowspan="5" style="text-align:center"|2004 (8th) 
|style="background:#FAEB86"|Katamari Damacy|style="background:#FAEB86"|Namco
|style="background:#FAEB86"|Namco
!scope="row" rowspan="5" style="text-align;center;" |
|-
|City of Heroes|Cryptic Studios
|NCSoft
|-
|Fable|Lionhead Studios
|Microsoft Game Studios
|-
|Grand Theft Auto: San Andreas|Rockstar North
|Rockstar Games
|-
|Half-Life 2|Valve
|Valve, Vivendi Universal Games
|-
!scope="row" rowspan="5" style="text-align:center"|2005 (9th) 
|style="background:#FAEB86"|Guitar Hero|style="background:#FAEB86"|Harmonix
|style="background:#FAEB86"|RedOctane
!scope="row" rowspan="5" style="text-align;center;" |
|-
|God of War|Santa Monica Studio
|Sony Computer Entertainment
|-
|King Kong|Ubisoft Montpellier
|Ubisoft
|-
|Nintendogs|Nintendo EAD
|Nintendo
|-
|Psychonauts|Double Fine Productions
|Majesco Entertainment
|-
!scope="row" rowspan="5" style="text-align:center"|2006 (10th) 
|style="background:#FAEB86"|Wii Sports|style="background:#FAEB86"|Nintendo EAD
|style="background:#FAEB86"|Nintendo
!scope="row" rowspan="5" style="text-align;center;" |
|-
|Brain Age: Train Your Brain in Minutes a Day!|Nintendo SPD
|Nintendo
|-
|Company of Heroes|Relic Entertainment
|THQ
|-
|The Elder Scrolls IV: Oblivion|Bethesda Game Studios
|2K Games, Bethesda Softworks
|-
|The Legend of Zelda: Twilight Princess|Nintendo EAD
|Nintendo
|-
!scope="row" rowspan="5" style="text-align:center"|2007 (11th) 
|style="background:#FAEB86"|Portal|style="background:#FAEB86"|Valve
|style="background:#FAEB86"|Valve
!scope="row" rowspan="5" style="text-align;center;" |
|-
|BioShock|2K Boston, 2K Australia
|2K Games
|-
|Call of Duty 4: Modern Warfare|Infinity Ward
|Activision
|-
|Rock Band|Harmonix
|MTV Games
|-
|Super Mario Galaxy|Nintendo EAD
|Nintendo
|-
!scope="row" rowspan="5" style="text-align:center"|2008 (12th) 
|style="background:#FAEB86"|World of Goo|style="background:#FAEB86"|2D Boy
|style="background:#FAEB86"|2D Boy, Nintendo
!scope="row" rowspan="5" style="text-align;center;" |
|-
|Fable II|Lionhead Studios
|Microsoft Game Studios
|-
|Fallout 3|Bethesda Game Studios
|Bethesda Softworks
|-
|Gears of War 2|Epic Games
|Microsoft Game Studios
|-
|Left 4 Dead|Valve South
|Valve
|-
!scope="row" rowspan="5" style="text-align:center"|2009 (13th) 
|style="background:#FAEB86"|Batman: Arkham Asylum|style="background:#FAEB86"|Rocksteady Studios
|style="background:#FAEB86"|Warner Bros. Interactive Entertainment
!scope="row" rowspan="5" style="text-align;center;" |
|-
|Call of Duty: Modern Warfare 2|Infinity Ward
|Activision
|-
|Mario & Luigi: Bowser's Inside Story|AlphaDream
|Nintendo
|-
|Plants vs. Zombies|PopCap Games
|PopCap Games
|-
|Uncharted 2: Among Thieves|Naughty Dog
|Sony Computer Entertainment
|}

 2010s 
The Outstanding Achievement in Game Design was not offered at the awards ceremonies from 2011 to 2014.

 2020s 

 Multiple nominations and wins 
 Developers and publishers 
Nintendo is the most nominated developer and the only developer to have won more than once. Nintendo has also won the most as a publisher and is tied with Sony for publishing the most nominees. Warner Bros. Interactive Entertainment technically published back-to-back winners, but the 4-year gap in which the award was not offered was between wins.

 Franchises The Legend of Zelda'' franchise is the most nominated franchise and is the only franchise to have won more than once.

Notes

References 

D.I.C.E. Awards
Awards established in 1998
Awards for best video game